Marquem Nuguen Gonçalves Ferreira (born 30 November 1983), commonly known as Marquem Gonçalves or simply Marquem, is a Brazilian footballer who is currently unattached.

Marquem was a product of São Paulo youth academy in Brazil.

Career
Marquem was a product of São Paulo youth academy in Brazil. He left Brazil to join Vegalta Sendai in Japan, only at the age of 20. He only spent a year with Vegalta Sendai with the main reason of not having enough playing time and normally was an unused sub. He returned to Brazil and join Esporte Clube Juventude B team.

Failing to join any top clubs in Brazil, he continued to play for lower division clubs such as Esporte Clube Noroeste, Clube 15 de Novembro and the Anápolis Futebol Clube in Brazil.

Marquem also had a short season with the Mozambique club, Liga Muçulmana de Maputo in 2008.

After 8 years playing in the lower division with various clubs, he eventually left Brazil and joined the Malaysian club, Negeri Sembilan FA alongside Jean-Emmanuel Effa Owona on 30 November 2011, after Marquen managed to impress coach, Mohd Azraai Khor Abdullah. However, he later failed to register in the league after failing meeting the Football Association of Malaysia rules and requirements.

International career
Maruem once appeared with the Brazil national under-19 football team in 2000, after an impressive season with the São Paulo youth academy.

References

External links
 
 Marquen Nuquen Goncalves Ferreira Data.7m

1983 births
Living people
Brazilian footballers
Brazilian expatriate footballers
Sportspeople from Sergipe
J1 League players
Vegalta Sendai players
América Futebol Clube (SP) players
Campinense Clube players
Anápolis Futebol Clube players
Expatriate footballers in Japan
Liga Desportiva de Maputo players
Association football defenders